The Anglican Diocese of Okene is one of eleven within the Anglican Province of Lokoja, itself one of 14 provinces within the Church of Nigeria. The current bishop is Emmanuel Onsachi.

Notes

Dioceses of the Province of Lokoja
Church of Nigeria dioceses